Robert Brown Peebles (23 September 1882 – 18 March 1959) was a Scottish professional golfer who played in the early 20th century. He had one top-ten finish in a golf major championship when he finished tied for seventh place in the 1909 U.S. Open.

Early life
Peebles was born in Elie and Earlsferry, Scotland. He emigrated to the United States in 1900 to further his career as a professional golfer.

Golf career

1909 U.S. Open
The 1909 U.S. Open was the 15th U.S. Open, held June 24–25 at Englewood Golf Club in Englewood, New Jersey. George Sargent established a new tournament scoring record to win his only major title, four strokes ahead of runner-up Tom McNamara.

Peebles shot 76-73-73-78=300 in the four-round event. He tied with four other golfers on 300 and took home $35 in prize money.

Death and legacy
Peebles died in the March 1959. Over the course of his long career, he worked at nearly a dozen different golf clubs, including Congressional Country Club and Mexico City Country Club. He was survived by his wife, two daughters, and a son.

Results in major championships

Note: Peebles played only in the U.S. Open.

"T" indicates a tie for a place
? = unknown
Yellow background for top-10

References

Scottish male golfers
People from Elie and Earlsferry
People from Greenville, Ohio
1882 births
1959 deaths